Toluenediamine may refer to these isomeric organic compounds with the formula C6H3(NH2)2(CH3):

2,4-Diaminotoluene, precursor to toluene diisocyanate and azo dye. 
2,6-Diaminotoluene, a common impurity in 2,4-diaminotoluene 
2,5-Diaminotoluene, precursor to hair dyes.

Alkyl-substituted benzenes